"From My Heart to Yours" is a song by Irish recording artist Laura Izibor. It was released as the lead single from her debut album, Let the Truth Be Told.

Background
Izibor noted that "From My Heart to Yours" was "one of the easiest songs" she wrote. She explained the song, saying: "It just kinda came together really easily. It's about how you feel when you are in love and is a reflection of the whole experience." The song was used in the television series Grey's Anatomy.

Reception
"From My Heart to Yours" received generally favorable reviews from music critics. Described as a "feisty" lead single, the song possesses "hip-poppy" characteristics. Irish newspaper Sligo Weekender praised the song for its being "an unforgettable melody coupled with an equally unforgettable voice". Dave Donnelly of Allmusic called the song impressive, but disliked the "irritating glitch vocal samples that litter" the song.

Charts

Weekly charts

Year-end charts

References

2008 debut singles
Laura Izibor songs
2008 songs
Atlantic Records singles